Pseudopostega sacculata is a moth of the family Opostegidae. It known only from south-western Ecuador.

The length of the forewings is about 2.6 mm. Adults are on wing in January and June.

External links
A Revision of the New World Plant-Mining Moths of the Family Opostegidae (Lepidoptera: Nepticuloidea)

Opostegidae
Moths described in 1915